Temnobasis is a monotypic moth genus of the family Crambidae described by Max Gaede in 1916. It contains only one species, Temnobasis simialis, described in the same article, which is found in Cameroon.

References

Natural History Museum Lepidoptera genus database

Acentropinae
Monotypic moth genera
Moths of Africa
Crambidae genera
Taxa named by Max Gaede